Baron Arundell of Trerice, in the County of Cornwall, was a title in the Peerage of England. It was created in 1664 for the Royalist soldier and politician Richard Arundell. He was the second son of Sir John Arundell and the great-grandson of Admiral Sir John Arundell. He was succeeded by his son, the second Baron. He sat as a Member of Parliament for Truro. The title became extinct on the death of his grandson, the fourth Baron, in 1768.

The family seat was Trerice, Cornwall.

Barons Arundell of Trerice (1664)
 Richard Arundell, 1st Baron Arundell of Trerice (d. 1687)
 John Arundell, 2nd Baron Arundell of Trerice (1649–1698)
 John Arundell, 3rd Baron Arundell of Trerice (1678–1706)
 John Arundell, 4th Baron Arundell of Trerice (1701–1768)

References

Further reading

Pedigree of Arundell of Trerice, Vivian, J. L., ed. (1887). The Visitations of Cornwall: comprising the Heralds' Visitations of 1530, 1573 & 1620; with additions by J.L. Vivian. Exeter: W. Pollard, p. 11 et seq.

Extinct baronies in the Peerage of England
Cornish nobility
Baron
1664 establishments in England
Noble titles created in 1664